"Knock Yourself Out" is a song by American rapper Jadakiss, and the second single from his debut studio album Kiss tha Game Goodbye (2001). The song was produced by The Neptunes.

Background
The song originally had a different beat, produced by Pharrell Williams, who also came up with the hook. Pharrell changed the beat, because he thought it was too slow for the song. When Jadakiss heard the new instrumental, he was not satisfied with it, but fellow rapper Styles P suggested he use the beat anyway. Jadakiss liked the new beat, but not as much as the original.

Music video
The music video was shot in Malibu, California on July 3, 2001 and directed by Little X. It features Canadian model Melyssa Ford and a scene of her diving in a pool.

Remix
An unreleased remix of the song features American rapper Ludacris. In February 2018, Ludacris shared a snippet of the remix in an interview with Ebro Darden on Beats 1.

Charts

References

2001 singles
2001 songs
Jadakiss songs
Song recordings produced by the Neptunes
Songs written by Jadakiss
Songs written by Pharrell Williams
Songs written by Chad Hugo
Ruff Ryders Entertainment singles
Interscope Records singles